Tempest DuJour is the stage name of Patrick Lee Holt, an American drag performer most known for competing on season 7 of RuPaul's Drag Race. Holt is also an associate professor at the University of Arizona.

Career
Tempest DuJour has performed in Tucson, and hosted Retro Game Show Night at Club Congress, as of 2013.

Tempest DuJour competed on the seventh season (2015) of RuPaul's Drag Race. She was the oldest contestant (age 46 at the time) and the first eliminated in the competition. She remains the second oldest contestant to compete on the show, as of 2021. She appeared in episodes of season 10 and season 14.

Tempest DuJour appeared in the film Cherry Pop, directed by Assaad Yacoub.

She was named Best Drag Queen by Tucson Weekly five times in a row, including in 2019, 2020, and 2021.

Outside of drag, Holt is an educator. He was an associate professor at the University of Arizona's School of Theatre, Film and Television, as of 2014.

Personal life 
Holt and his husband David have two children.

Filmography

Film
 Cherry Pop

Television
 RuPaul's Drag Race (season 7)

See also 
 List of people from Tucson, Arizona
 List of University of Arizona people

References

External links

 
 Patrick Holt at College of Fine Arts, University of Arizona

Living people
American drag queens
LGBT academics
LGBT people from Arizona
People from Tucson, Arizona
RuPaul's Drag Race contestants
University of Arizona faculty
Year of birth missing (living people)